The Unity Committee (Единство, Edinstvo) was an organization supporting the Bulgarian population of Thrace and Macedonia, remained within the Ottoman Empire after the division of the San Stefano Bulgaria and the decision of the Berlin Treaty. First Committee "Unity" was established on August 29, 1878, in Veliko Tarnovo. Its main objective was enshrined in the Constitutive protocol: Unity of all Bulgarians and their wellness today.  The initiative for this belonged to Lyuben Karavelov, Stefan Stambolov and Hristo Ivanov - Golemia. The goal of this new committee was to create such committees around the country of Bulgaria. Soon after Edinstvo was formed in Tarnovo, steps were taken to spread it to all towns in Bulgaria and Eastern Rumelia as well. People were also sent to Macedonia. As a consequence the  Kresna-Razlog Uprising was organized.

References

See also
 Kresna-Razlog Uprising

Modern history of Bulgaria
1878 establishments in Bulgaria
Organizations established in 1878
Bulgarian revolutionary organisations
Defunct organizations based in Bulgaria
Revolutionary organizations against the Ottoman Empire
Macedonian Question